Earth section paths are plane curves defined by the intersection of an earth ellipsoid and a plane (ellipsoid plane sections). Common examples include the great ellipse (containing the center of the ellipsoid) and normal sections (containing an ellipsoid normal direction). Earth section paths are useful as approximate solutions for geodetic problems, the direct and inverse calculation of geographic distances. The rigorous solution of geodetic problems involves skew curves known as geodesics.

Inverse problem 
The figure to the right illustrates the notation used here. Let  have geodetic latitude   and longitude  (k=1,2). This problem is best solved using analytic geometry in earth-centered, earth-fixed (ECEF) Cartesian coordinates.
Let  and  be the ECEF coordinates of the two points, computed using the geodetic to ECEF transformation discussed here.

Section plane 
If  is the origin then the earth section is the great ellipse. (The origin would be co-linear with 2 antipodal points so a different point must be used in that case). Let  be given. To put the equation of the plane into the standard form, where , requires the components of a unit vector, normal to the section plane. The orientation convention used here is that  points to the left of the path. If this is not the case then redefine .

Azimuth 
A vector tangent to the path is:
Therefore, the azimuth may be obtained from a two-argument arctangent function, .

Section ellipse 
The (non-trivial) intersection of a plane and ellipsoid is an ellipse. Before this can be done the ellipse must be defined and the limits of integration computed.
If  then the section is a horizontal circle of radius , which has no solution if .

Arc Length 
That arc length formula may be rearranged and put into the form:
, where
 and the coefficients are

Then  is a vector from the center of the ellipse to the point. Letting , we have .

On the other hand it's possible to use Meridian arc formulas in the more general case provided that the section ellipse parameters are used rather than the spheroid parameters. One such rapidly convergent series is given in Series in terms of the parametric latitude. If we use  to denote the spheroid eccentricity, i.e. , then  ≤  ≅ . Similarly the third flattening of the section ellipse is bounded by the corresponding value for the spheroid, and for the spheroid we have  ≅ , and  ≅ . Therefore it may suffice to ignore terms beyond  in the parametric latitude series.
To apply  in the current context requires converting the central angle to the parametric angle using , and using the section ellipse third flattening. Whichever method is used, care must be taken when using  &  or  &  to ensure that the shorter arc connecting the 2 points is used.

Direct problem 
The direct problem is given , the distance , and departure azimuth , find  and the arrival azimuth .

Section plane 
Having made such a choice, and considering orientation proceed as follows. 
The normal vector ),  together with  defines the plane. In other words, the tangent takes the place of the chord since the destination is unknown.

Locate arrival point 
This is a 2-d problem in span{},  which will be solved with the help of the arc length formula above. If the arc length,  is given then the problem is to find the corresponding change in the central angle  , so that  and the position can be calculated. The inverse of the central angle arc length series above may be found on page 8a of Rapp, Vol. 1, who credits Ganshin. The inverse meridian problem for the ellipsoid provides the inverse to Bessel's arc length series in terms of the parametric angle. Once  is known apply the inverse formula to obtain, where . So an ECEF vector may be computed using . Finally calculate geographic coordinates via  using Bowring's 1985 algorithm, or the algorithm here.

Azimuth 

Examples

The great ellipse 

The great ellipse is the curve formed by intersecting the ellipsoid with a plane through its center. Therefore, to use the method above, just let  be the origin, so that  (the position vector of ).  This method avoids the esoteric and sometimes ambiguous formulas of spherical trigonometry, and provides an alternative to the formulas of Bowring. The shortest path between two points on a spheroid is known as a geodesic. Such paths are developed using differential geometry. The equator and meridians are great ellipses that are also geodesics. The maximum difference in length between a great ellipse and the corresponding geodesic of length 5,000 nautical miles is about 10.5 meters. The lateral deviation between them may be as large as 3.7 nautical miles. A normal section connecting the two points will be closer to the geodesic than the great ellipse, unless the path touches the equator.

On the WGS84 ellipsoid, the results for the great elliptic arc from New York,  = 40.64130°,  = -73.77810°
to Paris,  = 49.00970°, = 2.54800° are:

 = 53.596810°,  = 111.537138° and  = 5849159.753 (m) = 3158.293603 (nm). The corresponding numbers for the geodesic are:

 = 53.511007°,  = 111.626714° and  = 5849157.543 (m) = 3158.292410 (nm).

To illustrate the dependence on section type for the direct problem, let the departure azimuth and trip distance be those of the geodesic above, and use the great ellipse to define the direct problem. In this case the arrival point is 
 = 49.073057°, = 2.586154°, which is about 4.1 nm from the arrival point in Paris defined above. Of course using the departure azimuth and distance from the great ellipse indirect problem will properly locate the destination,  = 49.00970°, = 2.54800°, and the arrival azimuth  = 111.537138°.

Normal sections 
Unless the two points are both on the same parallel or the same meridian, the reciprocal normal section will be a different path than the normal section. The above approach provides an alternative to that of others, such as Bowring. The importance of normal sections in surveying as well as a discussion of the meaning of the term line in such a context is given in the paper by Deakin, Sheppard and Ross. 

On the WGS84 ellipsoid, the results for the normal section from New York,  = 40.64130°,  = -73.77810°
to Paris,  = 49.00970°, = 2.54800° are:

 = 53.521396°,  = 111.612516° and  = 5849157.595 (m) = 3158.292438 (nm).
The results for the reciprocal normal section from New York to Paris are:

 = 53.509422°,  = 111.624483° and  = 5849157.545 (m) = 3158.292411 (nm).

The maximum difference in length between a normal section and the corresponding geodesic of length 5,000 nautical miles is about 6.0 meters. The lateral deviation between them may be as large as 2.8 nautical miles.

To illustrate the dependence on section type for the direct problem, let the departure azimuth and trip distance be those of the geodesic above, and use the surface normal at NY to define the direct problem. In this case the arrival point is 
 = 49.017378°, = 2.552626°, which is about 1/2 nm from the arrival point defined above. Of course, using the departure azimuth and distance from the normal section indirect problem will properly locate the destination in Paris. 
Presumably the direct problem is used when the arrival point is unknown, yet it is possible to use whatever vector  one pleases. For example, using the surface normal at Paris, results in an arrival point of  = 49.007778°, = 2.546842°, which is about 1/8 nm from the arrival point defined above. Using the surface normal at Reykjavik (while still using the departure azimuth and trip distance of the geodesic to Paris) will have you arriving about 347 nm from Paris, while the normal at Zürich brings you to within 5.5 nm.

The search for a section that's closer to the geodesic led to the next two examples.

The mean normal section 
The lateral deviation between them is no more than about 0.8 nautical miles. For paths of length 1000 nautical miles the length error is less than a millimeter, and the worst case lateral deviation is about 4.4 meters.
Continuing the example from New York to Paris on WGS84 gives the following results for the mean normal section:

 = 53.515409°,  = 111.618500° and  = 5849157.560 (m) = 3158.292419 (nm).

The midpoint normal section 
This path is only slightly closer to the geodesic that the mean normal section. The maximum difference in length between a midpoint normal section and the corresponding geodesic of length 5,000 nautical miles is about 0.3 meters. The worst case lateral deviation between them is about 0.3 nautical miles.

Finishing the example from New York to Paris on WGS84 gives the following results for the geodesic midpoint normal section:
 = 53.506207°,  = 111.627697° and  = 5849157.545 (m) = 3158.292411 (nm).

Discussion 
All of the section paths used in the charts to the right were defined using the indirect method above. In the third and fourth charts the terminal point was defined using the direct algorithm for the geodesic with the given distance and initial azimuth. On each of the geodesics some points were selected, the nearest point on the section plane was located by vector projection, and the distance between the two points computed. This distance is described as the lateral deviation from the geodesic, or briefly geodesic deviation, and is displayed in the charts on the right. The alternative of finding the corresponding point on the section path and computing geodesic distances would produce slightly different results.

The first chart is typical of mid-latitude cases where the great ellipse is the outlier. The normal section associated with the point farthest from the equator is a good choice for these cases.

The second example is longer and is typical of equator crossing cases, where the great ellipse beats the normal sections. However, the two normal sections deviate on opposite sides of the geodesic, making the mean normal section a good choice here.

The third chart shows how the geodesic deviations vary with initial geodesic azimuth originating from 20 degrees north latitude. The worst case deviation for normal sections of 5000 nautical miles length is about 2.8 nm and occurs at initial geodesic azimuth of 132° from 18° north latitude (48° azimuth for south latitude).

The fourth chart is what the third chart looks like when departing from the equator. On the equator there are more symmetries since sections at 90° and 270° azimuths are also geodesics. Consequently the fourth chart shows only 7 distinct lines out of the 24 with 15 degree spacing. Specifically, the lines at azimuths 15, 75, 195 and 255 coincide, as do the lines at 105, 165, 285, and 345 on the other side as the inner most (other than the geodesics). Next farthest coincident lines from the four geodesic lines are at azimuths 30, 60, 210, and 240 on one side and 120, 150, 300, and 330 on the other side. The outer most lines are at azimuths 45, and 225 on one side and 135 and 315 on the other. As the departure point moves north the lines at azimuths 90 and 270 are no longer geodesics, and other coincident lines separate and fan out until 18° latitude where the maximum deviation is attained. Beyond this point the deviations contract like a Japanese fan as the initial point proceeds north. So that by 84° latitude the maximum deviation for normal sections is about 0.25 nm.

The midpoint normal section is (almost) always a good choice.

Intersections 
Assuming that the two planes are not parallel, the line of intersection is on both planes.

Since this line is on both section planes, it satisfies both: 
, and 
.

, and 
.

On the intersection line we have ,  where .

To find the intersection of this line with the earth, plug the line equations into , to get
, where , 
,
.

If , then there is no intersection.

Plugging t into
, gives the points of intersection of the earth sections.

Example 
Find where a section from New York to Paris, intersects the Greenwich meridian. The results are as follows:

Extreme latitudes and longitudes 
The maximum (or minimum) latitude is where the section ellipse intersections a parallel at a single point. To set up the problem, let 
,  
be the given section plane. The parallel is 
The resulting quadratic coefficients are 
, 
,
.
This equation may be rearranged and put into the form , where 
, 
, and 
.
Therefore,  provides the distance from the origin of the desired parallel planes. Recall that  so ,  are the remaining coordinates of the intersections. The geographic coordinates may then be computed using the ECEF_to_Geo conversion.

The same method may be applied to meridians to find extreme longitudes, but the results are not easy to interpret due to the modular nature of longitude. However, the results can always be verified using the following approach.

It may be worth mentioning here that the line of intersection of two planes consists of the set of fixed points, hence the rotation axis, of a coordinate rotation that maps one plane onto the other.

For the New York to Paris example the results are:

See also
Geographical distance#Altitude correction
Normal-section azimuth

Notes

References

Further reading
 
 

Geodesy
Plane curves